North Dorchester High School is a rural American high school, located in Hurlock, Maryland.

In addition to Hurlock, it serves other small Dorchester County, Maryland, communities including Beach Haven, Brookview, East New Market, Eldorado, Elliotts Island, Galestown, Rhodesdale, Secretary and Vienna.

Description
The community is one of agriculture, seafood harvest, and agribusiness with some light industry.  Employment opportunities exist both within the immediate area and the nearby Maryland communities of Cambridge, Easton and Salisbury; as well as Seaford, Delaware. North Dorchester High School received a brand new high school in 2019, costing almost 50 million dollars.

North Dorchester High offers a fair number of Advanced Placement (AP) courses at the school and have classes that prepare you for the SAT. The school offers many opportunities like teacher assistant, dual enrollment, and internship opportunities. It has many rigorous courses and excellent teachers that lend a hand to help all students learn and succeed in the future. The environment is very comfortable and welcoming. Counselors do a good job of informing students of new opportunities to make their college career paths easier and more effective. Their graduation rate is great, sitting at 92% as of 2021. Most kids head to college, specifically Salisbury University, Chesapeake College, Towson University, and University of Maryland College Park.

North Dorchester High School also has a good number of students enroll post-high school at HBCUs. The popular HBCUs include University of Maryland Eastern Shore and Morgan State University.

A small, close-knit and student-oriented school, it is a comprehensive high school which offers college preparatory, honors and advanced-placement courses as well as information-technology and vocational-education programs.  , the school had approximately 540 students in grades 9–12, but increasing enrollment was anticipated in the coming years.

The school is accredited by the Middle States Association of Colleges and Schools and by the Maryland State Department of Education.

Administration
Principal: Mr. David P. Stofa
Assistant Principal: Mr. Derek Sabedra
Assistant Principal: Ms. Karen Bowers

Faculty Members

Administration:
David P. Stofa
| Derek Sabedra - Dorchester County Athletic Director
| Karen Bowers

Guidance/Office:
Ami Parks - 10th/12th Consular
| Tomika Young - 9th/11th Consular
| Diana Creighton - Guidance Secretary
| Donna Payne - School Nurse
| Stefanie Fuchs - Social Worker
| Bridget Adeshed - Attendance Secretary
| Michelle Hurley - Payment Secretary
| Carol Hubbard - Administrative Secretary

English Language Arts:
Todd J. Nock
| Adam Wilson
| Nicole Benner

Mathematics:
Karen Spear
| Matthew Da'Mario
| Phillip Albert
| Ngita Inshu
| Chloe Hackett
| Joelle Siwald

Social Studies:
Gregory Alsworth
| James Bailey
| Scott Baker
| Benjamin Hromanik
| Jason Thomas

Science:
Kaylen May Trice
| Linda Barnes
| Madison Lamb
| Kaitlyn Preckrel
| John Preckrel
| Thomas Mills

Miscellaneous:
David Morissette- Physical Education / Athletic Director
| Terri Wright - Physical Education
| Karen Mercer - Choral Director
| Scott Bunting - Band Director
| Mohammad Dajani - Technology
| Joyce Reisch - Technology
| Jennifer Powell - Art
| Jen Eames - German
| Benedita Gomes - Spanish

See also

 Education in Maryland
 List of high schools in Maryland

References

External links
 ndhs.dcpsmd.net, the school's official website

Educational institutions in the United States with year of establishment missing
Public high schools in Maryland
Schools in Dorchester County, Maryland
Educational institutions established in 1954
1954 establishments in Maryland